= Laxman Bhatt Tailang =

Indian classical vocalist

- Born: 24 December 1928; Rajasthan, India
- Died: 10 February 2024 (aged 95) Jaipur, Rajasthan, India
- Genres: Hindustani classical music
- Occupations: Classical vocalist, music educator
- Instrument: Vocal
- Years active: 1950–2024
- Award: Padma Shri (2024)

Laxman Bhatt Tailang was an Indian classical vocalist associated with the dhrupad tradition of Hindustani music. He worked as a music educator in Rajasthan for several decades and was announced as a recipient of the Padma Shri, India's fourth-highest civilian award, in 2024.

== Education and career ==
Tailang was born in 1928. He received his initial musical instruction from Pandit Raja Bhaiya Poonchwale of the Gwalior gharana, focusing on Khyal and Dhrupad styles.

He later moved to New Delhi to study at the Shriram Bharatiya Kala Kendra on a government scholarship. There, he received further training under Nasir Moinuddin Khan Dagar and Nasir Aminuddin Khan Dagar of the Dagarvani tradition.

Tailang worked primarily as a vocalist and teacher of Indian classical music. He served as a lecturer in music at Banasthali Vidyapith from 1950 to 1992. He later taught at the Rajasthan Music Institute in Jaipur.

In 1985, he founded the Rasmanjari Sangeetopasna Kendra in Jaipur. In 2001, he established the International Dhrupad-Dham Trust. His work was primarily associated with the teaching and performance of dhrupad, one of the oldest forms of Hindustani classical music.

== Death ==
Tailang died on 10 February 2024 at a hospital in Jaipur, aged 95. His death occurred shortly after the announcement of the 2024 Padma Shri recipients and prior to the official award ceremony.
